Giorgi Iluridze (born 20 February 1992) is a Georgian footballer who plays for Telavi.

Career
A product of his hometown's FC Dinamo Tbilisi and a youth international, Iluridze was scouted and signed by FC Anzhi Makhachkala in 2010, where he made his first team debut in the Russian Premier League on 6 May 2010, aged 18, in a 3–0 away loss against FC Spartak Moscow, coming in the 75th minute for Mikhail Bakayev. He gathered 4 further caps for his team before a row of injuries impeded his career. After his recovery, he couldn't get any further chances with the first team, playing with Anzhi's youth squad until the end of 2011.

In early 2012, he signed with FC Dila Gori back in his native Georgia, where he would spend the next year and a half.

He then moved to Croatia's HNK Hajduk Split in late August 2013, having been noted by his new team after he had scored the sole goal in Dila's 1–0 away win in the UEFA Europa League against them. He made his Hajduk debut on 14 September in a 2–0 home win against Dinamo Zagreb. He made 15 appearances, scoring one goal and assisting two others in his sole season at Hajduk. He was released from his contract in April, 2014.

International career
A former youth international, Iluridze was called up for Georgia's 2014 FIFA World Cup qualification Group I matches in September 2013 against France and Finland but he didn't join the team due to injury.

References

External links
 Profile by the Russian Football Premier League 
 
 
 

1992 births
Footballers from Tbilisi
Living people
Footballers from Georgia (country)
Georgia (country) youth international footballers
Georgia (country) under-21 international footballers
Association football forwards
FC Dinamo Tbilisi players
FC Anzhi Makhachkala players
FC Dila Gori players
HNK Hajduk Split players
Ermis Aradippou FC players
FC Zestafoni players
FC SKA-Khabarovsk players
Ethnikos Achna FC players
FC Dinamo Batumi players
FC Samtredia players
FC Telavi players
Russian Premier League players
Erovnuli Liga players
Croatian Football League players
Russian First League players
Cypriot First Division players
Erovnuli Liga 2 players
Expatriate footballers from Georgia (country)
Expatriate footballers in Russia
Expatriate sportspeople from Georgia (country) in Russia
Expatriate footballers in Croatia
Expatriate sportspeople from Georgia (country) in Croatia
Expatriate footballers in Cyprus
Expatriate sportspeople from Georgia (country) in Cyprus